Margaret Anne Evans  (born 31 August 1944) is a New Zealand local-body politician. She was the Mayor of Hamilton, New Zealand from 1989 to 1998, succeeding Ross Jansen.

Biography
Evans was born in Feilding on 31 August 1944, and was educated at New Plymouth Girls' High School. She studied at the University of Waikato in 1964.

First elected to the Hamilton City Council in 1974, Evans was a city councillor until 1989, including a period as deputy mayor from 1983 to 1988. She was elected mayor of Hamilton in 1989. She was also a member of the Auckland Harbour Board between 1986 and 1989, and the Waikato Regional Council from 1989 until 1992. Evans also served on the Waikato Electricity Authority and the Council of the University of Waikato.

Evans was a member of the New Zealand Party, founded by businessman Bob Jones, and she stood unsuccessfully for Parliament in the Hamilton East electorate in the 1984 election.

Honours and awards
In 1990, Evans received the New Zealand 1990 Commemoration Medal, and in 1993 she was awarded the New Zealand Suffrage Centennial Medal. In the 1995 New Year Honours, Evans was appointed a Commander of the Order of the British Empire, for services to local government.

Notes

References

External links
 1990s photo

1944 births
Living people
People from Feilding
People educated at New Plymouth Girls' High School
University of Waikato alumni
Mayors of Hamilton, New Zealand
Women mayors of places in New Zealand
Auckland Harbour Board members
Waikato regional councillors
New Zealand Commanders of the Order of the British Empire
Recipients of the New Zealand Suffrage Centennial Medal 1993
New Zealand justices of the peace
New Zealand Party politicians
Unsuccessful candidates in the 1984 New Zealand general election